Villa Marie was a settlement in Newfoundland, Canada. It began as a quarry for Silica that operated from 1968 to 1988. It was located northeast of Placentia, along the C.N.R. tracks. It is now part of the Town of Placentia.

See also
List of communities in Newfoundland and Labrador

References

Populated coastal places in Canada
Populated places in Newfoundland and Labrador